Hugh Murnin (12 July 1865 – 11 March 1932) born Bathgate was a Scottish politician, Labour MP for Stirling and Falkirk Burghs from 1922 to 1923, and from 1924 to 1931.

Murnin left elementary school aged nine, entered the mines, and worked his way up to become checkweighman at Bannockburn Colliery in 1891, then agent to the Stirlingshire Miners' County Union from 1897, and serving as President of the National Union of Scottish Mineworkers from 1920 to 1922, then as vice-president for a few more years.

A Roman Catholic, Murnin apparently suggested the formation of a centrist Scottish Catholic party in 1912. Like Joseph Sullivan (1866–1935), another Catholic miner, Murnin first managed to be elected to Parliament in 1922.

References

External links

1865 births
1932 deaths
Scottish Roman Catholics
Scottish miners
Scottish trade unionists
Members of the Parliament of the United Kingdom for Stirling constituencies
Scottish Labour MPs
Members of the Parliament of the United Kingdom for Scottish constituencies
Miners' Federation of Great Britain-sponsored MPs
UK MPs 1922–1923
UK MPs 1924–1929
UK MPs 1929–1931